Robert Patrick Jarvis (born March 18, 1941) is an American former professional baseball player.

Career
Jarvis was born in Carlyle, Illinois and attended Carlyle High School. He pitched collegiately at Murray State University. Originally signed by the Chicago Cubs, he was traded to the Braves in 1963 and was voted that team's top rookie for 1966.

Over a four-season span from 1967–70, Jarvis was one of the National League's top starting pitchers, winning 60 games. He was Atlanta's starting pitcher in Game 3 of the 1969 National League Championship Series, played at Shea Stadium in New York City. A first-inning Hank Aaron home run staked Jarvis to a 2-0 lead, but he ended up the losing pitcher in a 7-4 defeat to the New York Mets. He surrendered Ernie Banks' 500th career MLB home run in the second inning of the Braves' 11-inning 4–3 loss to the Chicago Cubs at Wrigley Field on May 12, 1970.

Jarvis won just 19 games in his final three seasons before ending his career with the Montreal Expos in 1973. He had been traded from the Braves to the Expos for Carl Morton on February 28, 1973. He was dealt from the Expos to the Texas Rangers for Larry Biittner on December 20, 1973.

After retiring from baseball, Jarvis served in several government positions in the state of Georgia, including Sheriff of Dekalb County. In 1999 he was convicted of fraud and served 15 months in federal prison. He currently runs an organic nursery in Rutledge, Georgia.

References

External links

1941 births
Living people
American expatriate baseball players in Canada
American politicians convicted of fraud
American sportspeople convicted of crimes
Atlanta Braves players
Atlanta Crackers players
Austin Senators players
Baseball players from Illinois
Duluth-Superior Dukes players
Florida Instructional League Braves players
Georgia (U.S. state) politicians convicted of crimes
Georgia (U.S. state) sheriffs
Jamestown Tigers players
Montgomery Rebels players
Montreal Expos players
Morristown Cubs players
Murray State Racers baseball players
People from Carlyle, Illinois
Prisoners and detainees of the United States federal government
Richmond Braves players
American people convicted of mail and wire fraud